Evolution Group plc is a leading British-based financial services business. It is headquartered in London and is a former constituent of the FTSE 250 Index. It was acquired by Investec in 2011.

History
The Company, formed in 1999 as Evestment plc, was initially listed on the Alternative Investment Market. In 2000 it merged with Christows, a west country stockbroker. In 2001 it bought a research house known as Evolution Capital and changed its own name to Evolution Group.

It went on to merge with Beeson Gregory in 2002 and to acquire Williams de Broë in 2006.

On 12 November 2004, Evolution Beeson Gregory was fined £500,000 by the Financial Services Authority for executing trades that distorted the market. Evolution sold short 252% of the share capital of Room Service Group plc without any plan to settle the trades. Evolution's head of market making Christopher Potts was also fined £75,000.

It was acquired by Investec in 2011.

The Ontario Lottery and Gaming Corporation added live dealer entertainment. At the end of October 2021, the Corporation announced its cooperation with the Evolution company.

Operations
The Group is organised into two activities:
 Evolution Securities: investment banking for mid-market companies
 Williams de Broë: stockbroking and fund management

References

External links
 Official site

Defunct companies based in London
Financial services companies established in 1999
1999 establishments in England